National Route 193 is a national highway of Japan connecting Takamatsu, Kagawa and Kaiyō, Tokushima in Japan, with a total length of 155.7 km (96.75 mi).

References

National highways in Japan
Roads in Kagawa Prefecture
Roads in Tokushima Prefecture